is a Japanese musical actress and singer.

Born from Tokyo, she graduated from Senzoku Gakuen College of Music Faculty of Music Musical Course. She is represented with Toho Entertainment. While studying at the university, she debuted professionally as Juliette of the musical Roméo et Juliette, and later appeared to her topical work such as the musicals Hamlet, Les Misérables, Miss Saigon and so on, and is called the "new-generation diva of the musical world". She also debuted as a singer with "Watashi wa Sōzō suru".

Biography, personal life
She liked to sing from a young age, and also to play and dance, and from 2003 to 2006 she belonged to the Children's Theatre Ōkina Yume and acted primarily in leading roles. In 2009, when was on third grade high school, she was selected as the role of the girl Anne in the music play Anne of Green Gables sponsored by the DPI-NGO UN Classical Live Association.

In 2010, she studied at the Senzoku Gakuen High School Music School from the Senzoku Gakuen College of Music Faculty of Music Musical Course. She passed the audition of Toho Entertainment in 2011 while enrolled in her second year of college, and in the heroine audition of the musical Roméo et Juliette which received in less than a month after entering the office, she was selected as Juliette from among many candidates, which made her major work pro debut. Her first starring in the stage Yūdoku Shōnen that became her first straight play in the same year. After that she also appeared in the topic's work by acting as the heroine Ophelia  of the musical Hamlet and role of Éponine of the musical Les Misérables, and attracted attention as the "new-generation diva of the musical world" from her singing ability.

Meanwhile, in 2012, she made her first television drama appearance as Clara in TV Asahi's Murder at Mt. Fuji, and in 2013 she debuted as a singer with the opening theme "Watashi wa Sōzō suru" in the television anime Majestic Prince.

When she graduated from the Senzoku Gakuen College of Music Faculty of Music Musical Course in 2014, she played in the musicals The Addams Family as Wednesday Addams and Miss Saigon as Kim. In addition, she was in charge of opening theme "Niji no kakera" of the TV anime One Week Friends as a singer.

In October 2016, her performance in the Imperial Theater of the musical Miss Saigon which was scheduled to appear was cancelled for the treatment of the nodule of her vocal folds, after surgery and rehabilitation, she returned from the first day of her Nagoya performance on 19 January 2017.

In April 2017, she acted as a voice actress of the heroine Belle played by Emma Watson through an audition at the Japanese dub version of the Walt Disney Pictures live-action version of Beauty and the Beast.

Jazz pianist Ai Kuwabara was her high school classmate.

Appearances

Musicals
Anne of Green Gables (Apr–Oct 2009) – as Anne
Roméo et Juliette (Sep–Oct 2011) – as Juliette
Hamlet (Feb–Mar 2012) – as Ophelia
Songs for a New World (Aug 2012)
Les Misérables – as Éponine
(Apr–Nov 2013)
(Apr–Sep 2015)
(May–Jul 2017)
(May–Oct 2019)
Sherlock Holmes –Anderson Ie no Himitsu– – as Lucy (Jan 2014)
The Addams Family – as Wednesday Addams
(Apr–May 2014)
(Oct–Dec 2017)
Miss Saigon – as Kim
(Jul–Sep 2014)
(Oct 2016-Jan 2017)
(Mar-Jun 2020)
(Aug-Oct 2022)
First Date (Nov–Dec 2014) – as Allison
Blood Brothers (Feb–Mar 2015) – as Linda
Grand Hotel (Apr–May 2016) – as Frida Flaemmchen
Coin Locker Babies (Jun–Jul 2016) – as Anemones
Nine Tales –Kyūbiko no Monogatari– (Jan 2018) – as Baika
The Secret Garden – as Martha
(Jun–Jul 2018)
Marie Antoinette – as Margrid Arnaud
(Sep 2018–Jan 2019) 
(Jan–Feb 2021) 
Love Letters – as Melissa
(November 1, 2019)
Rockabilly Jack – as Lucie Jones
(14 September-30 December 2019)
Human history – as Young Woman
(23 October-3 November 2020)
Merrily We Roll Along – as Beth
(17-31 May 2021)
The Last Five Years – as Cathy Hiatt
(28 June-18 July 2021)
DOGFIGHT – as Rose
(17 September-24 October 2021)
The Rocky Horror Show – as Janet Weiss
(13 January-28 February 2022)
Next to Normal – as Natalie
(25 March-17 April 2022) 
Matilda – as Miss Honey
(Spring 2023)

Stage
Yūdoku Shōnen (Nov 2011) starring; as Non-toxic girl
Rōdoku Geki Watashi no Atama no Naka no Keshi Gomu 6th letter (31 May – 1 Jun 2014)
Music Play The Little Prince (Dec 2015 – Jan 2016) – as the Prince

TV dramas
Murder at Mt. Fuji (Apr–Jun 2012, EX) – as Clara

TV anime
Majestic Prince (Apr 2013 –, JAITS) – as Kon Natsumi (GDF public relations officer)

Films
Beauty and the Beast (2017, Premium Dubbed version) – Starring; as Belle

Live
Animelo Summer Live 2015 -The Gate- (28 Aug 2015)

Discography

Singles

Tie-ups

References

Notes

Sources

External links
 
 
 

Japanese musical theatre actresses
Japanese women pop singers
Anime singers
Singers from Tokyo
1991 births
Living people